Lakkopetra is a village and a community in the northeastern part of the municipal unit of Larissos, northwestern Achaea, Greece. The community consists of the villages Lakkopetra, Ioniki Akti, Karnari and Limanaki. It is located on the Gulf of Patras, 4 km east of Araxos, 4 km northwest of Limnochori, 9 km west of Kato Achaia and 26 km southwest of Patras. It is 3 km northeast of the Araxos Airport. Ioniki Akti is a known beach resort.

Historical population

See also
List of settlements in Achaea

External links
Eurosion on Lakkopetra's Beach
GTP - Lakkopetra

References

Populated places in Achaea